The Bergen International Film Festival (BIFF) is a film festival held annually in October in Bergen, Norway since 2000, and is the largest film festival in the nation in number of films. The festival celebrated its 20th edition in 2019, featuring more than 150 films in the program. The festival leader is Tor Fosse, and BIFF is owned by Bergen Cinema.

The festival´s main venue is Bergen Cinema's Magnus Barefoot Cinema Centre, with  additional screenings taking place at the local art film theatre Cinemateket at Georgernes Verft and at the student cinema at Kvarteret.

History

In 2000, Bergen was a European Capital of Culture. Due to the occasion, Bergen Cinema arranged Bergen International Film Festival, with the most important films from the festival circuit of the year and many sneak previews of movies already picked up for Norwegian distribution. BIFF was one of the most successful events to take place during the celebration of the Cultural City, and was arranged again the year after.

Over the years the festival has grown to become the biggest film festival in Norway, with more than 150 films and 60,000 admissions in 2019.

Programmes

Bergen International Film Festival is organised in various sections:

 Cinema Extraordinaire, the main international competition program of fiction films.
 Documentaire Extraordinaire, the main international competition program of documentary films.
 Checkpoints, a competition program consisting of documentaries focusing on human rights, in collaboration with the Rafto Foundation for Human Rights. Since 2010, a jury has selected a winner, where the prize is awarded to the organization or cause depicted in the film.
 The Golden Owl, a competition program consisting of documentaries focusing on the dissemination of science and research, in collaboration with the University of Bergen.
 Norwegian Documentary Program, with competition programs for best Norwegian documentary and best Norwegian short documentary.
 Norwegian Short Film Competition, a competition program of best Norwegian short fiction film.
 Norwegian Music Video Competition, a competition program of best Norwegian music video.

BIFF and education

Bergen International Film Festival has an extensive program for high school and junior high school students in Bergen. BIFFs offers schools in the area to participate in two different programs:

BIFF for Schools
The festival offers free showing of documentaries that covers important subjects in history, democracy and human rights. BIFF also tries to bring filmmakers and even the characters the films portray to the screenings, making it possible for the students to converse with the talent afterwards. In 2010, former mayors of Bogotá, Antanas Mockus and Enrique Peñalosa held strong appeals to students of the power of local democracy after the showings of Bogota Change.

The School Film Festival
BIFF also offers a crash course film school for junior high schools, with professional filmmakers holding seminars. The festival then make camera and editing stations available for the students, and award one school each year for best student film.

Audience Numbers

Awards at Bergen International Film Festival

Cinema Extraordinare (discontinued in 2011, re-established in 2016)
The former main award at Bergen International Film Festival, awarded to the best feature film 2000-2011. The prize has had its present name since 2007. 2000-2005 it was called The Jury's Award, and 2006-2007 it was named The Norwegian Film Institute's Import Award, with the prize being Norwegian distribution.

 2000: Luna Papa, directed by Bakhtyar Khudojnazarov 
 2001: Lagaan, directed by Ashutosh Gowariker 
 2002: Dog Days, directed by Ulrich Seidl 
 2003: Blind Shaft, directed by Li Yang 
 2004: Mysterious Skin, directed by Gregg Araki 
 2005: Frozen Land, directed by Aku Louhimies 
 2006: The Minder, directed by Rodrigo Moreno 
 2007: Silent Light, directed by Carlos Reygadas 
 2008: The World is Big and Salvation Lurks Around the Corner, directed by Stefan Komandarev 
 2009: No One's Son, directed by Arsen Anton Ostojić 
 2010: Le Quattro Volte, directed by Michelangelo Frammatino  
 2016: House of others, directed by Rusudan Glurjidze     
 2017: A Ciambra, directed by Jonas Carpignano    
 2018: Ayka, directed by  Sergei Dvortsevoy      
 2019: House of Hummingbird,  directed by Bora Kim   and La Llorona,  directed by Jayro Bustamante     
 2020: The Trouble With Being Born,  directed by Sandra Wollner     
 2021: Sundown, directed by Michel Franco

Best International Documentary/Documentaire Extraordinaire
Awarded since 2004, after BIFF started to shift its focus more over to documentaries. The prize is 50,000 NOK, since 2013 awarded by NRK.

 2004: The Master and His Pupil, directed by Sonia Herman Dolz 
 2005: The Boys of Baraka, directed by Heidi Ewing and Rachel Grady 
 2006: God Grew Tired of Us, directed by Christopher Dillon Quinn  
 2007: Forever, directed by Heddy Honigmann 
 2008: War Child, directed by Christian Karim Chrobog  
 2009: Afghan Star, directed by Havana Marking  
 2010: The Autobiography of Nicolae Ceausescu, directed by Andrei Ujică  
 2011: Buck, directed by Cindy Meehl  
 2012: 
 2013: The Unknown Known, directed by Errol Morris  
 2014: Waiting for August, directed by Teodora Ana Mihai   
 2015: Pervert Park, directed by Frida Barkfors and Lasse Barkfors    
 2016: Brothers of the Night, directed by Patric Chiha  
 2017: Makala, directed by Emmanuel Gras    
 2018: Minding the Gap, directed by Bing Liu     
 2019: Midnight Family, directed by Luke Lorentzen    
 2020: The Wall of Shadows, directed by Eliza Kubarska    
 2021: Ascension, directed by Jessica Kingdon

Best Norwegian Documentary
Awarded since 2011. The prize is 40,000 NOK, since 2013 awarded by NRK.

 2011: Folk ved fjorden, directed by Øyvind Sandberg
 2012: De andre, directed by Margreth Olin
 2013: Banaz A Love Story, directed by Deeyah Khan
 2014: Drone, directed by Tonje Hessen Schei
 2015: Voldtatt, directed by Linda Steinhoff
 2016: Barneraneren, directed by Jon Haukeland
 2017: Nowhere to Hide, directed by Zaradasht Ahmed  
 2018: For vi er gutta, directed by Petter Sommer, Jo Vemund Svendsen 
 2019: Descent into the Maelstrom,  directed by Jan Vardøen 
 2020: Odelsgut og Fantefølge,  directed by Merethe Offerdal Tveit 
 2021: Sommerbarna, directed by Linn Helene Løken

Checkpoints
Awarded since 2010 and one of the main prizes at BIFF, selected by a jury from a competition program consisting of films focusing on human rights.

 2010: Budrus, directed by Julia Bacha 
 2011: The Last Mountain, directed by Bill Haney 
 2012:  Sons of the Clouds: The Last Colony, directed by Alvaro Longoria  
 2013: The Act of Killing, directed by J. Oppenheimer 
 2014: Drone (2014 film), directed by Tonje Hessen Schei 
 2015: The Hunting Ground, directed by Kirby Dick 
 2016: The War Show, directed by Obaidah Zytoon and Andreas M. Dalsgaard 
 2017:  Radio Kobani, directed by Reber Dosky  
 2018:  Laila at the Bridge, directed by Elizabeth and Gulistan Mirzaei   
 2019: For Sama, directed by Waad Al-Khateab and Edward Watts   
 2020: Welcome to Chechnya, directed by David France  
 2021: Writing With Fire, directed by Rintu Thomas and Sushmit Gosh

The Golden Owl
Awarded by the University of Bergen since 2014 to the best science documentary. The prize is 25,000 NOK.

 2014: How I Came to Hate Math, directed by Olivier Peyon 
 2015: Ice and the Sky, directed by Luc Jacquet 
 2016: Monster in the mind, directed by Jean Carper 
 2017: Let There Be Light, directed by Mila Aung-Thwin, Van Royko   
 2018: The Serengeti Rules, directed by Nicholas Brown    
 2019: Jim Allison: Breakthrough,  directed by Bill Haney    
 2020: Lost in Face,  directed by Valentin Riedl    
 2021: The Hunt for Planet B, directed by Nathaniel Kahn

Best Norwegian Short Film
Awarded since 2004.

 2003: Fear Less, directed by Therese Jacobsen
 2004: The Bible, directed by Bjørn Amundlien
 2005: Drømme kan du gjøre senere, directed by Thomas A. Østbye
 2006: Drømmehuset, directed by Øystein Mamen
 2007: Bo jo cie kochom (Fordi jeg elsker deg), directed by Gine Therese Grønner
 2008: Ekornet, directed by Stian Einar Forgaard
 2009: Skylappjenta, directed by Iram Haq
 2010: Jenny, directed by Ingvild Søderlind
 2011: Asyl, directed by Jørn Utkilen
 2012: Å vokte fjellet, directed by Izer Aliu
 2013: Money Back Please, directed by Even Hafnor
 2014: Ja vi elsker, directed by Hallvar Witzø
 2015: Small Talk, directed by Even Hafnor
 2016: The Committee, directed by Gunnhild Enger
 2017: No Man is an Island, directed by Ali Parandian 
 2018: Kulturen, directed by Ernst De Geer 
 2019: Fun Factory,  directed by Even Hafnor, Lisa Brooke Hansen 
 2020: Papapa,  directed by Kerren Lumer-Klabbers 
 2021: Stikk, directed by Tobias Klemeyer Smith

Best Norwegian Short Documentary
Awarded since 2011. The prize is 10,000 NOK, since 2013 awarded by NRK.

 2011: Selger 327, directed by Kari Anne Moe
 2012: Havets sølv, directed by Are Pilskog
 2013: Du velger selv, directed by Kajsa Næss
 2014: Dette er Kabul, directed by Sadaf Fetrat, Sahar Fetrat, Nargis Azaryun, Anders Sømme Hammer and Christoffer Næss
 2015: Asylbarna: Farida, directed by Ragnhild Sørheim og Christer Fasmer
 2016: Boys, directed by Sunniva Sundby
 2017: I det fri, directed by Edvard Karijord, Bendik Mondal 
 2018: The Future of Iraq, directed by Thee Yezen Al-Obaide, Mats Muri 
 2019: Filmen om Farmor, directed by Anine Wiesner Barg 
 2020: Greetings From Myanmar, directed by Sunniva Sundby, Andreas J. Riiser 
 2021: Skolen ved Havet, directed by Solveig Melkeraaen

Best Norwegian Music Video
Awarded 2017-2020. Replaced Best Scandinavian Music Video.

 2017: Daniel Kvammen feat. Lars Vaular - "Som om Himmelen Revna", directed by Eivind Landsvik
 2018: Hanne Hukkelberg feat. Emilie Nicolas - "Embroidery", directed by Alam Ali
 2019: Teddy and the Love Gang - "Nozomi", directed by Håvard Glad
 2020: The Musical Slave - "They can´t stop you", directed by Kristin Vollset
 2021: Ane Brun - "Crumbs", directed by Stian Andersen
 2022: Gundelach - "Golden", directed by Fredrik Harper

The Audience Award

 2000: Crouching Tiger, Hidden Dragon, directed by Ang Lee 
 2001: Das Experiment, directed by Oliver Hirschbiegel 
 2002: Bowling for Columbine, directed by Michael Moore 
 2003: Kill Bill Vol. 1, directed by Quentin Tarantino 
 2004: Oldboy, directed by Park Chan-wook 
 2005: Sirkel, directed by Aleksander Nordaas 
 2006: The Queen, directed by Stephen Frears 
 2007: Fashion Victims, directed by Ingo Rasper 
 2008: Young@Heart, directed by Stephen Walker 
 2009: Bring Children from Streets, directed by Espen Faugstad and Eivind Nilsen 
 2010: World Peace and Other 4th Grade Achievements, directed by Chris Farina 
 2011: Bully, directed by Lee Hirsch 
 2012: Beasts of the Southern Wild, directed by Benh Zeitlin 
 2013: Siblings are forever, directed by Frode Fimland 
 2014: Good Girl, directed by Solveig Melkeraaen 
 2015: Raped, directed by Linda Steinhoff 
 2016: The Handmaiden, directed by Park Chan-wook 
 2017: Call Me By Your Name, directed by Luca Guadagnino    
 2018: En affære,  directed by Henrik Martin Dahlsbakken    
 2019: Woman, directed by Yann Arthus-Bertrand, Anastasia Mikova

Youth Jury's Documentary Award
A prize awarded since 2004 by a jury consisting of high school students that choose from the films that is a part of the BIFF for Schools program.

 2004: Outfoxed: Rupert Murdoch's War on Journalism, directed by Robert Greenwald 
 2005: Lost Children, directed by Oliver Stoltz 
 2006: A Crude Awakening: The Oil Crash, directed by Basil Gelpke and Ray McCormack  
 2007: Sharkwater, directed by Rob Stewart 
 2008: Yodok Stories, directed by Andrzej Fidyk 
 2009: The Cove, directed by Louie Psihoyos 
 2010: Bogota Change, directed by Andreas Møl Dalsgaard 
 2011: Bully, directed by Lee Hirsch 
 2012: 5 Broken Cameras, directed by Emad Burnat & Guy Davidi 
 2013: The Human Scale, directed by Andreas Dalsgaard 
 2014: We Are the Giant, directed by Greg Barker 
 2015: The Mask You Live In, directed by Jennifer Siebel Newsom 
 2016: The Crossing, directed by George Kurian 
 2017: Plastic China, directed by Jiuliang Wang   
 2018: Silvana film), directed by Mika Gustafson, Olivia Kastebring, Christina Tsiobanelis  
 2019: Drag Kids, directed by Megan Wennberg  
 2020: Vinden Snur, directed by Kieran Kolle  
 2021: Faceless, directed by Jennifer Ngo

Young Talent Award
A cash prize awarded from Vestnorsk Filmsenter since 2005.

 2005: Aleksander Nordaas
 2006: Morvary Samaré and Astrid Schau-Larsen
 2007: Tor Kristian Liseth
 2008: Olav Øyehaug
 2009: Espen Faugstad and Eivind Nilsen
 2010: Kedy Hassani
 2011: Frida Eggum Michaelsen
 2012: Are Pilskog
 2013: Mads Andersen
 2014: Kjell Mathiesen
 2015: Hildegunn Wærness
 2016: David Alræk
 2017: Arne Daniel Storevold Haldorsen 
 2018: Thorvald Nilsen 
 2019: Unknown 
 2020: Selim Mutic 
 2021: Benjamin Garcia Langeland

Best Scandinavian Music Video  (discontinued)
Awarded 2010-2013.

 2010: Torgny - "The Only Game", directed by Emil Trier  
 2011: Who Made Who - "Every Minute Alone", directed by William Stahl  
 2012: Todd Terje - "Inspector Norse", directed by Kristoffer Borgli 
 2013: The Knife - a Tooth for an Eye,

The Critic's Award (discontinued)
Only awarded once, by the film journalists attending the festival in 2003.

 2003: A Good Lawyer's Wife, directed by Im Sang-soo

The Festival by year
2003 Bergen International Film Festival
2009 Bergen International Film Festival
2010 Bergen International Film Festival

References

External links
Official site

 
Film festivals in Norway
2000 establishments in Norway
Festivals in Bergen
Film festivals established in 2000
Autumn events in Norway